The 2016 Menards 250 presented by Valvoline was the thirteenth stock car race of the 2016 NASCAR Xfinity Series season, and the 25th iteration of the event. The race was held on Saturday, June 11, 2016, in Brooklyn, Michigan, at Michigan International Speedway, a 2 miles (3.2 km) permanent tri-oval shaped superspeedway. The race took the scheduled 125 laps to complete. In an exciting battle for the win, Daniel Suárez, driving for Joe Gibbs Racing, would make a last lap pass on Kyle Busch, and earn his first career NASCAR Xfinity Series win. He would become the first Mexican driver to win a NASCAR national series race. Busch mainly dominated the race, leading 88 laps. To fill out the podium, Paul Menard, driving for Richard Childress Racing, would finish in third, respectively.

Background 

The track is used primarily for NASCAR events. It is sometimes known as a sister track to Texas World Speedway, and was used as the basis of Auto Club Speedway. The track is owned by NASCAR. Michigan International Speedway is recognized as one of the motorsports' premier facilities because of its wide racing surface and high banking (by open-wheel standards; the 18-degree banking is modest by stock car standards).

Entry list 

 (R) denotes rookie driver.
 (i) denotes driver who is ineligible for series driver points.

Practice

First practice 
The first practice session was held on Friday, June 10, at 12:30 PM EST. The session would last for 55 minutes.

Final practice 
The final practice session was held on Friday, June 10, at 3:00 PM EST. The session would last for 55 minutes.

Qualifying 
Qualifying was held on Saturday, June 11, at 10:00 AM EST. Since Michigan International Speedway is at least , the qualifying system was a single car, single lap, two round system where in the first round, everyone would set a time to determine positions 13–40. Then, the fastest 12 qualifiers would move on to the second round to determine positions 1–12.

Full qualifying results

Race results

Standings after the race 

 Note: Only the first 12 positions are included for the driver standings.

References 

2016 NASCAR Xfinity Series
NASCAR races at Michigan International Speedway
June 2016 sports events in the United States
2016 in sports in Michigan